Kearsarge Pinnacles is a linear series of 12 pillars and crags on a northwest–southeast trending ridge located one mile west of the crest of the Sierra Nevada mountain range, in the southeast corner of Fresno County, in northern California. The highest, number 4, rises to 12,008 feet in elevation (3,660 meters), whereas number 8 is the most prominent. The John Muir Trail traverses below the west aspect of this remote geographical feature. The Kearsarge pinnacles, lakes, peak, and pass were named after the Kearsarge mine to the east, which was named by its owners after the USS Kearsarge. In turn, the ship was named after Mount Kearsarge in New Hampshire.

Climate
According to the Köppen climate classification system, the Kearsarge Pinnacles are located in an alpine climate zone. Most weather fronts originate in the Pacific Ocean, and travel east toward the Sierra Nevada mountains. As fronts approach, they are forced upward by the peaks, causing them to drop their moisture in the form of rain or snowfall onto the range (orographic lift). Precipitation runoff from the ridge drains into tributaries of Bubbs Creek, which in turn is a tributary of the South Fork Kings River.

Gallery

See also

 East Vidette
 List of mountain peaks of California

References

External links
 Weather forecast: Kearsarge Pass

Mountains of Fresno County, California
Mountains of Kings Canyon National Park
North American 3000 m summits
Mountains of Northern California
Sierra Nevada (United States)